Adıyaman District (also: Merkez, meaning "central") is a district of Adıyaman Province of Turkey. Its seat is the city Adıyaman. Its area is 1,814 km2, and its population is 312,207 (2021).

Composition
There are 3 municipalities in Adıyaman District:
 Adıyaman
 Kömür
 Yaylakonak

There are 135 villages in Adıyaman District:

 100. Yıl
 Ağaçkonak
 Ağcin
 Ağikan
 Ağveren
 Ahmethoca
 Akçalı
 Akdere
 Akhisar
 Akpınar
 Akyazı
 Albet
 Alibey
 Atakent
 Ataköy
 Aydınlar
 Bağdere
 Bağlıca
 Bağpınar
 Bağpınar Kuyucak
 Başpınar
 Battalhüyük
 Bebek
 Bozatlı
 Bozhüyük
 Boztepe
 Börkenek
 Büklüm
 Büyükkavaklı
 Büyükkırıklı
 Çınarik
 Çakmaklar
 Çamgazi
 Çamlıca
 Çamyurdu
 Çatalağaç
 Çayırlı
 Çaylı
 Çemberlitaş
 Çobandede
 Damdırmaz
 Damlıca
 Dardağan
 Davuthan
 Derinsu
 Dişbudak
 Doğanlı
 Doyran
 Durak
 Durukaynak
 Düzce
 Ekinci
 Elmacık
 Esence
 Eskihüsnümansur
 Girik
 Gökçay
 Gölpınar
 Gözebaşı
 Göztepe
 Gümüşkaya
 Güneşli
 Güzelyurt
 Hacıhalil
 Hasancık
 Hasankendi
 Ilıcak
 Işıklı
 İncebağ
 İnceler
 İpekli
 Kalburcu
 Karaağaç
 Karagöl
 Karahöyük
 Karakoç
 Kaşköy
 Kavak
 Kayacık
 Kayadibi
 Kayalı
 Kayaönü
 Kemerkaya
 Kındırali
 Kızılcahöyük
 Kızılcapınar
 Koçali
 Koruköy
 Kozan
 Kuşakkaya
 Kuştepe
 Kuyucak
 Kuyulu
 Küçükhasancık
 Külafhüyük
 Lokman
 Malpınarı
 Mestan
 Olgunlar
 Oluklu
 Ormaniçi
 Palanlı
 Paşamezrası
 Payamlı
 Pınaryayla
 Rezip
 Sarıharman
 Sarıkaya
 Serhatlı
 Şemikan
 Şerefli
 Taşgedik
 Taşpınar
 Tecir
 Tekpınar
 Terman
 Toptepe
 Uğurca
 Uludam
 Uzunköy
 Uzunpınar
 Üçdirek
 Varlık
 Yarmakaya
 Yayladamı
 Yazıbaşı
 Yazıca
 Yazlık
 Yedioluk
 Yenice
 Yenigüven
 Yeniköy
 Yeşilova
 Zey
 Ziyaretpayamlı

References

Districts of Adıyaman Province